Soaserana is a town and commune in southwest Madagascar. It belongs to the district of Betioky Sud, which is a part of Atsimo-Andrefana Region. The population of the commune was estimated to be approximately 8,000 in 2001 commune census.

Only primary schooling is available. It is also a site of industrial-scale  mining. The majority 55% of the population of the commune are farmers, while an additional 40% receives their livelihood from raising livestock. The most important crops are peanuts and rice, while other important agricultural products are maize and cassava.  Services provide employment for 5% of the population.

References and notes 

Populated places in Atsimo-Andrefana